"On Slide Inn Road" is a short story by Stephen King, first published in the October/November 2020 issue of Esquire.

Plot summary
The Brown family - husband and wife Frank and Corinne, their children Billy and Mary, and Frank's Vietnam veteran father Donald ("Grandpop") - are driving from Falmouth, Maine to Derry, Maine to visit Granpop's sister, who is dying from cancer. The trip is being made in Grandpop's elderly Buick Estate station wagon. Grandpop has brought various pieces of baseball memorabilia belonging to his sister (a former member of the Maine Black Bears who played shortstop in the Women's Baseball World Series) to show her, including her softball glove (with Dom DiMaggio's signature), baseball cards, and a Louisville Slugger with Ted Williams' signature.

The family have detoured down "Slide Inn Road", which Grandpop states is a shortcut to Highway 196. The road is initially asphalt, but eventually becomes dirt and then hardpan. Shortly after the family pass the remains of the eponymous Slide Inn - which has burned down some time before - the family reach a washout at the top of a hill, obliging Frank to reverse down the hill to the Slide Inn to turn the car around. As Frank reverses the car, he accidentally reverses into a ditch while attempting a three-point turn.

Billy and Mary walk to the remains of the Slide Inn. There is a panel truck with a Delaware license plate parked next to the ruins. As Billy looks into the flooded former cellar hole, he sees a woman's leg protruding from the water. Billy and Mary are then confronted by two men, Galen Prentice and Pete Smith, who are implied to have murdered the woman. Billy attempts to lead the men to believe that he did not see the woman's leg.

After Galen and Pete help Frank push the Buick out of the ditch, Pete produces a .38 revolver and robs Frank and Grandpop of their wallets and Corinne of her purse. Grandpop, suspecting that Galen and Pete will go on to murder the family and steal the Buick, claims that he has $3,300 in the trunk of the car. As Galen looks in the trunk, Grandpop hits him several times with the autographed baseball bat. Pete attempts to shoot Grandpop; Frank fails to react, but Billy seizes Pete's arm, enabling Grandpop to break his wrist with the bat and disarm him. Pete flees, while Galen is revealed to have died. The family retrieve the revolver and their possessions before leaving in the Buick to call the police.

References

See also
 Stephen King short fiction bibliography

External links 
 "On Slide Inn Road" at StephenKing.com
 "On Slide Inn Road" at Esquire.com

Short stories by Stephen King
2020 short stories
Crime short stories
Horror short stories
Maine in fiction
Works originally published in Esquire (magazine)